Valleyfield may refer to:

 Valleyfield, Fife, Scotland
 Valleyfield, Newfoundland and Labrador, Canada
 Valleyfield, Prince Edward Island, a community in Prince Edward Island
 Salaberry-de-Valleyfield, Quebec, historically referred to in English as Valleyfield. 
 , chartered by the Hudson's Bay Company from 1831–1843, see Hudson's Bay Company vessels

See also
 Valleyfield Braves (disambiguation)